Kabaena or Tokotua is an island in the Flores Sea, Indonesia, off the coast of Sulawesi. Most of it is a part of Bombana Regency within Southeast Sulawesi province, although the southernmost district (Talaga Raya) is administratively part of Central Buton Regency. The island's area is 891.36 km2 and its total population at the 2010 Census was 35,558 and at the 2020 Census was 42,877; the official estimate as at mid 2021 was 43,464.

Administrative Districts
The island includes six of the 22 districts of Bombana Regency, and one district of Central Buton Regency. These seven districts are tabulated below with their areas and their populations at the 2010 Census and the 2020 Census, together with the official estimates as at mid 2021. The table also includes the administrative centre of each district, the number of administrative villages (rural desa and urban kelurahan) and small offshore islands in each district, and its post code.

Note: (a) Includes the offshore islands of Damalawa Besar and Damalawa Kecil.

Villages 
The island's 40 villages (rural desa and urban kelurahan) are listed below with their areas and their populations at the 2020 Census. Six of the 40 villages (indicated by asterisks below) have the status of kelurahan, while the other 34 are desa.

References

Islands of Sulawesi
Landforms of Southeast Sulawesi
Populated places in Indonesia